Connaught Village is a commercial and residential area just west of Marble Arch and just north of Hyde Park within the City of Westminster, London. As part of the Hyde Park Estate, it is owned by the Church Commissioners of England. Numerous boutiques, designer shops and restaurants reside in Connaught Village and it is often referenced as a hidden gem that you can spend many hours meandering around. The couture store of famous shoemaker Jimmy Choo was previously located here. Tony Blair, former leader of the Labour Party and Prime Minister, lives in Connaught Square.

Nearest places
 Paddington
 Notting Hill
 Marble Arch
 Hyde Park Speakers' Corner
 Connaught Square

External links
 Official Connaught Village Website
 Official Hyde Park Estate Website

Geography of the City of Westminster